Robert Bozic (born 1950) is a former professional heavyweight boxer from Toronto, Canada, between 1970-77. His boxing record was 14-3 (7 KOS). He fought and lost to Larry Holmes in Madison Square Garden in 1973.

Bob Bozic's father, Dobrivoje Božić, was a successful Serbian engineer who fled from Communism after World War II and emigrated to Canada. In the 1960s Bob Bozic became estranged from his father and was living in Toronto, a vagrant by choice. He was introduced to prize fighting by Bertie Mignacco, a local heavy who ran a bookmaking operation behind Ciro's restaurant. In his short career he had 17 fights, but after three losses he decided to end his boxing career. He used to spar with George Chuvalo, his friend.

Bozic used to work as a bartender in New York City at Fanelli Cafe.

Professional boxing record

References

External links
www.thesweetscience.com

Living people
1950 births
Canadian male boxers
Canadian people of Serbian descent
Heavyweight boxers